The 2020–21 AFC Bournemouth season was the club's 119th season in existence and first season back in the Championship following relegation from the Premier League in the previous season. Aside of the Championship, Bournemouth also competed in the FA Cup, and participated in the EFL Cup.

Players

First-team squad

Out on loan

Transfers

Transfers in

Loans in

Loans out

Transfers out

Pre-season and friendlies

Competitions

Overview

EFL Championship

League table

Results summary

Results by matchday

Matches
The 2020–21 season fixtures were released on 21 August.

Play-offs

FA Cup

The third round draw was made on 30 November, with Premier League and EFL Championship clubs all entering the competition. The draw for the fourth and fifth round were made on 11 January, conducted by Peter Crouch.

EFL Cup

The draw for both the second and third round were confirmed on September 6, live on Sky Sports by Phil Babb.

Statistics

Appearances and goals

|-
! colspan=14 style=background:#dcdcdc; text-align:center| Goalkeepers

|-
! colspan=14 style=background:#dcdcdc; text-align:center|Defenders

|-
! colspan=14 style=background:#dcdcdc; text-align:center|Midfielders

|-
! colspan=14 style=background:#dcdcdc; text-align:center|Forwards

|-
! colspan=14 style=background:#dcdcdc; text-align:center|Players who have made an appearance or had a squad number this season but have left the club

|-
|}

Disciplinary record

Notes

References

External links

AFC Bournemouth seasons
AFC Bournemouth